Jakeville is an unincorporated community in Alberta Township, Benton County, Minnesota, United States.  The community is located near the junction of 85th Avenue NE and State Highway 25 (MN 25).  Nearby places include Gilman and Foley.

The Elk River flows nearby.

References

Unincorporated communities in Benton County, Minnesota
Unincorporated communities in Minnesota